Guy Ward is an American politician from West Virginia. He is a Republican and represented District 74 in the West Virginia House of Delegates. In May 2022, he was defeated in the primary by Mike DeVault.

References 

Living people
Year of birth missing (living people)
21st-century American politicians
Republican Party members of the West Virginia House of Delegates